Smolchev-Malinovsky is a rural locality (a khutor) in Dondukovskoye Rural Settlement of Giaginsky District, Adygea, Russia. The population of this village was 94 as of 2018. There are 10 streets.

Geography 
Smolchev-Malinovsky is located 33 km east of Giaginskaya (the district's administrative centre) by road. Ignatyevsky is the nearest rural locality.

References 

Rural localities in Giaginsky District